Dreifelden is an Ortsgemeinde – a community belonging to a Verbandsgemeinde – in the Westerwaldkreis in Rhineland-Palatinate, Germany.  The name translates literally to English as "three fields".

Geography

On the southern boundary of the Verbandsgemeinde of Hachenburg – a kind of collective municipality – in the northwest Westerwaldkreis lies Dreifelden, on the biggest lake found on the Westerwald Lake District (Westerwälder Seenplatte), the Dreifelder Weiher. The Verbandsgemeinde to which the community belongs has its seat in the eponymous town.

History
Dreifelden was first recorded in 1319.

In the centre of the village stands Holy Trinity Church (Dreifaltigkeitskirche), the oldest stone church in the Westerwald. Its origins go back to the Romanesque era around 1000 A.D. Until the Reformation it was used as pilgrimage church.

Politics

The municipal council comprises 9 council members, including the extra-official mayor (Bürgermeister), who was elected in a majority vote in a municipal election on 7 June 2009.

Economy and infrastructure

Transport
Dreifelden is linked to the long-distance road network by Bundesstraße 8, which joins the community to the town centres of Hachenburg (11 km) and Altenkirchen (26 km). The Autobahn interchanges Mogendorf und Dierdorf on the A 3 can be reached over Bundesstraßen 8 and 413. The Hennef interchange on the A 5 (AS 60) can be reached directly on Bundesstraße 8.

References

External links
 Dreifelden
 Dreifelden in the collective municipality’s Web pages 

Municipalities in Rhineland-Palatinate
Westerwaldkreis